"Just Like You" is the fifth single from American rock band Falling in Reverse's third album Just Like You. The song also featured a music video that already has over 10 million 500 thousand views, the music video features Falling In Reverse performing on a parody of The Voice called The Choice and Ronnie dresses up as all the judges. Some other musicians make appearances in the video, including Asking Alexandria's Danny Worsnop, the Word Alive's Tyler Smith and rapper B.LAY.

Personnel
Falling in Reverse
 Ronnie Radke – lead vocals
 Jacky Vincent – lead guitar
 Derek Jones – rhythm guitar, backing vocals
 Ryan Seaman – drums, percussion, backing vocals

Additional
 Charles Kallaghan Massabo – bass

Accolades

References 

Falling in Reverse songs
2015 songs
2015 singles
Epitaph Records singles
Songs written by Ronnie Radke
Songs written by Michael Baskette
Song recordings produced by Michael Baskette